Kiril Pandov can refer to:

 Kiril Pandov (boxer) (born 1943), Bulgarian Olympic boxer
 Kiril Pandov (footballer) (1928-2014), Bulgarian footballer
 Kiril Pandov (speed skater) (born 1983), Bulgarian Olympic speed skater